The Webster Central School District is a public school district in New York State that serves approximately 8,800 students in the town and village of Webster and portions of Penfield in Monroe County and portions of Ontario and Walworth in Wayne County with about 1,350 employees and an operating budget of $140.6 million (~$15,964 per student).

The average class size is 20 for grades K–2, 21 for grades 3–5, and 26 for grades 6–8, and 25 for grades 9–12.

Brian Neenan is the Superintendent of Schools.

Mission 
The Webster Central School District offers a broad range of academic programming focused on the social, emotional, and physical aspects of educating students as whole beings. Their mission is to incorporate the revolutionary concept of mindfulness into the lives of students and faculty members. Mindfulness strategies allow individuals to become more aware of understanding emotions and healthy responses to daily stress, both inside and outside of the classroom.

Curriculum 
Webster Central School District's curriculum includes an Advanced Placement program where students are offered a variety of courses for secondary students in which they may receive college credit. Students also have the option to enroll in numerous dual credit courses available through the district's partnership with Monroe Community College, the Rochester Institute of Technology and the College Level Examination Program (CLEP). These opportunities allow students to save money in their future endeavors of pursuing higher level collegiate education.

Webster Central School District's students have the opportunity to enhance their learning through the 1:1 student device initiative, Transforming Learning Through Technology. Through this initiative, students have access to their own electronic device, either a Dell Chromebook or iPad. The district strives to combine technology savvy learning. The program also offers students the opportunity to work as customer service and technology repair representatives for their peers as part of the Webster Technical Internship program. Students may also receive certification from Dell as part of their training.

Fine Arts 
Beginning in kindergarten, students participate in an outstanding music and fine arts curriculum. The National Association of Music Merchants Foundation honors the Webster Central School District as one of the Best Communities for Music Education in the United States.Secondary- level students have the opportunity to perform in yearly theater productions as well.

Athletics 
Secondary-level student athletes may choose from a broad range of nearly 20 different interscholastic sports in which they may participate at the modified, junior varsity and varsity levels. Webster Central School District's varsity level student athletes regularly achieve New York State's Scholar Athlete recognition that requires a team GPA of 90% or higher. Student athletes participate in special presentations about social media use and drug abuse as well.

Organization
The Board of Education (BOE) consists of 6 members who reside in the Webster School District. Members serve rotating 3-year terms. Elections are held each May for board members and to vote on the School District Budget.

Current board members are:
Mike Suffoletto: President
Sue Casey: Vice President
Ann Carmody
Linda Dioguardi
Mike Dedee
Tammy Gurowski
Mike Gustin

Schools

Elementary schools
 DeWitt Road Elementary School, built in 1962, is a two-story elementary (K-5) school serving approximately 500 students. The school is back to back with the retired Bay Road School. The principal is Mark Schichtel.
 Klem North Elementary School, built in 1965, is a one-story elementary (K-5) building, across from Klem South Elementary School, that serves approximately 500 students. The principal is Laura Ballou.
 Klem South Elementary School, built in 1971, is a one-story elementary (K-5) building, across from Klem North Elementary School, that serves approximately 500 students. The principal is Martha End.
 Plank Road North Elementary School, built in 1968, is a one-story elementary (K-5) building composed of 3 wings, across from Plank Road South Elementary School, and serves approximately 500 students. The Principal is Craig Bodensteiner.
 Plank Road South Elementary School, built in 1970, is a one-story elementary (K-5) building, across from Plank Road North Elementary School, and serves approximately 500 students. The principal is Jennifer Sullivan.
 Schlegel Road Elementary School, built in 1972, is a one-story elementary (K-5) building that offers 27 full-sized classrooms and serves approximately 500 students. The principal is Kate Hesla. 
 State Road Elementary School, built in 1963, is a one-story elementary (K-5) building with two main wings that serve approximately 500 students. The principal is Christine Noeth-Abele.

Secondary schools
 Willink Middle School, the district's newest school (built in 2001) is a 6-8 school serving approximately 1,000 students every day. The building is split up into three halls, or houses: Red, Green and Blue. The school offers cafeteria and gymnasium facilities. The principal is Brian Powers.
 Spry Middle School, located in the Village of Webster, serves approximately 1,000 students in the district's oldest building, originally opened in 1928 as Webster High School. It is split up into three houses: Red, White, and Blue. The principal is James Baehr.
Webster Thomas High School, located down the road from Willink Middle School, is a 9-12 school that has served approximately 2,069 students every day since its opening in 1960. The school features an auditorium and more recently constructed sports facilities. The school team is the Thomas Titans. The principal is Glenn Widor.
Webster Schroeder High School was constructed in 1968 and serves approximately 2,000 students each day. With a state-of-the-art brand-new Aquatics Center, it is the district's largest building. The school team is the Webster Warriors. The principal is Paul Benz.

References

External links

Webster Central School District Transportation Department
Webster Central School District Food Service
New York State School Boards Association

School districts in New York (state)
Education in Monroe County, New York
School districts established in 1948